KUAD-FM (99.1 MHz, "K99") is a country music-formatted radio station licensed to Windsor, Colorado, United States. The station serves the Ft. Collins-Greeley and Cheyenne areas. The station is currently owned by Townsquare Media.

On February 4, 2019, KUAD-FM rebranded from "K99" to "New Country 99.1".

On April 29, 2022, KUAD-FM returned to its "K99" branding.

References

External links

UAD-FM
Radio stations established in 1964
Townsquare Media radio stations
Country radio stations in the United States